Dul-e Mahi (also Romanized as Dūl-e Māhī and Dūlmāhī) is a village in Mishan Rural District, Mahvarmilani District, Mamasani County, Fars Province, Iran. At the 2006 census, its population was 62, in 12 families.

References 

Populated places in Mamasani County